Ebright is a surname. Notable people with the surname include: 

 A. M. Ebright (1881–1947), American college sports coach
 Hi Ebright (1859–1916), American baseball player
 Ky Ebright (1894–1979), American crew athlete and coach
 Richard H. Ebright, American molecular biologist
 Thomas Ebright, namesake of the Thomas Ebright Memorial Award

See also
 Ebright Azimuth
 Ebright Creek Park